Eagle Aviation France was a charter airline based in Saint-Nazaire, France. Its wet lease operations were based in Paris at Charles de Gaulle Airport.

History
The airline started operations in 2002. Eagle Aviation has operated 3 B757-2Q8 for Saudi Arabian Airlines in ACMI.

Fleet
The Eagle Aviation France fleet consists of the following aircraft (as of July 2009) :

1 Boeing 747-400
1 Boeing 757-200 *

References

External links

Eagle Aviation France
Eagle Aviation France Fleet

Defunct airlines of France
Airlines established in 1998
Airlines disestablished in 2009
Defunct charter airlines